Proteuxoa confinis is a moth of the family Noctuidae. It is found in New South Wales and Queensland, Australia.

External links
 Australian Faunal Directory

Proteuxoa
Moths of Australia
Moths described in 1857